An open loop or open-loop controller is a control loop or controller that has an absence of feedback.

It may also refer to:
 Open-loop model, a model studied in game theory in which players cannot observe the actions of other players

See also 
 Control system, a system for controlling a signal or process that may operate with an open or closed feedback loop
 Control theory, the theory of control systems, which involves the analysis of feedback loops
 Feedback, the effect of having the output of a system affect its input and thus have an effect on its subsequent output
 Process control, the control of processes, typically involving feedback loops